Justin Hill may refer to:
 Justin Hill (writer) (born 1971), English novelist
 Justin Hill (politician), American businessman and politician
 Justin Hill (baseball), American college baseball coach

See also
 Justin Hills, bassist